Ti voglio bene Eugenio (internationally released as I Love You Eugenio) is a 2002 Italian drama film directed by  Francisco José Fernandez. For this film Giancarlo Giannini was awarded with a David di Donatello for Best Actor.

Cast 
 Giancarlo Giannini: Eugenio
 Giuliana De Sio: Elena
 Arnoldo Foà: Prof. Bonelli
 Jacques Perrin: Federico 
 Riccardo Garrone: Maresciallo

References

External links

2002 films
Film
Down syndrome in film
Italian drama films
2000s Italian films
Films about disability